The National University of Cajamarca, or UNC for short, is a major public university located in Cajamarca, Peru; capital of the department of Cajamarca. The university was formally established on February 13, 1962, in accordance with a government decree.

UNC currently has approximately 8,152 students in ten different academic faculties, making it one of the largest universities in the north of the country. The current Headmaster is Carlos Tirado Soto.

Organization
UNC is organized into ten faculties which contain twenty-five professional academic schools.

External links
Universidad Nacional de Cajamarca Official Site

Cajamarca
Educational institutions established in 1963
1963 establishments in Peru